Washington Hotel or Hotel Washington may refer to:

Washington Hotel (Greenfield, Missouri)
Hotel Washington (Indianapolis, Indiana)
Hotel Washington (Washington, D.C.)
Hotel Washington (Madison, Wisconsin)

See also
George Washington Hotel (disambiguation)
Mount Washington Hotel, Bretton Woods, New Hampshire
Paris Hotel (San Diego), formerly Washington Hotel

Architectural disambiguation pages